Sir Salusbury Pryce Humphreys  (24 November 1778 – 17 November 1845), later called Salusbury Pryce Davenport, was an officer of the Royal Navy who saw service during the French Revolutionary and Napoleonic Wars and the War of 1812, rising to the rank of rear admiral.

He entered the navy during the Spanish armament in 1790 and served aboard a number of ships, starting at the level of able seaman and rising through the ranks, having reached midshipman on the outbreak of the French Revolutionary Wars. A lieutenancy followed while serving in the Caribbean, where he acted in support of army operations against enemy colonies and islands, before his return to Britain. He was afterwards employed in the English Channel and North Sea, where he distinguished himself on a cutting out expedition off the Dutch island of Schiermonnikoog, narrowly escaping death when a ship he tried and failed to board suddenly exploded. After again supporting land operations, this time in Holland, he was promoted to commander though he had to then wait two years for a command.

Promotion to post captain soon followed, and he went to North America to command the flagship of the admiral in command there. Humphreys did so, and requested permission to search her. Chesapeakes captain refused, so Humphreys fired upon her, the poorly prepared American ship surrendered and Humphreys took off several British deserters. The backlash from the Chesapeake-Leopard Affair, as it became known as, was severe. A political crisis was precipitated between the governments of Britain and the United States, and to mollify the Americans, Humphreys was given no further commands. He was already wealthy, having married an heiress, and settling at the estates of Bramall Hall. He was promoted to rear admiral in 1837, and then restored on the active lists, having changed his surname to Davenport in 1838 on the occasion of his wife's inheritance. He died in 1845.

Family and early life
Salusbury Pryce Humphreys was born at Clungunford Rectory, Shropshire, on 24 November 1778, the third son of Reverend Evan Humphreys and his wife Mary. He entered the navy on 1 July 1790, during the Spanish Armament, serving as a volunteer aboard the 64-gun , which was then under the command of Captain James Vashon. He was next aboard the 50-gun , the flagship of Rear Admiral Sir John Laforey in the Leeward Islands, followed by a posting to the 32-gun , commanded by Captain Matthew Squire. He was rated as able seaman during this last posting, after which he was moved to the 14-gun , commanded by Captain Francis Laforey. His next ship was the 50-gun , under Captain Paul Minchin, where he was rated as midshipman some time before the outbreak of war with Revolutionary France in February 1793. Severn conveyed the Governor General of Canada, Lord Dorchester, and his family and suite, to Quebec, returning to Britain in 1794. Humphreys followed Minchin to his next command, the 38-gun , and went out to the West Indies. While serving there, Humphreys was ordered to act as lieutenant of the 14-gun  under Captain Henry Evans in April 1796.

Humphreys was next in action supporting the army under Sir Ralph Abercromby at the siege of Saint Lucia, and afterwards convoyed the despatches concerning the attack on Porto Rico back to Britain. His promotion to lieutenant came on 17 January 1797, together with an appointment to the armed ship Sally, serving in the North Sea under Captain George Wolfe. In 1798 he received a posting to the 32-gun , also in the North Sea, under the command of Captain George Dundas.

Cutting out expedition
In an action on 11 August British boats succeeded in attacking and capturing the gunboat Crash, and preparing an operation to capture a large Dutch schooner, named Vengeance, anchored under the protection of a battery on the island, Mackenzie sent Humphreys and another lieutenant to capture some schuyts on 12 August. They captured two, burning one and sailing the other back to the British flotilla. Mackenzie armed the captured schuyt with 12-pounder carronades and named her Undaunted, placing Humphreys in command. Mackenzie launched his attack on the Dutch schooner and battery the following day, 13 August. Crash was supposed to have covered Humphreys in Undaunted, but she ran aground. Undaunted, Humphreys pushed on, coming alongside the Dutch schooner just as she was abandoned by her crew. The strong tide meant that he could not maintain his station alongside the Dutch vessel, and the roundness of her sides prevented him from leaping aboard. Instead he took a rope and jumped into the sea, hoping to be able to swim to the ship, board her and attach a rope. Once in the water he found that he could make little headway against the tide, and had to be hauled back on board. He had just regained the deck of Undaunted when Vengeance exploded, her crew having set a fuse to the ship's magazine before they abandoned her. Meanwhile, the rest of the flotilla successfully stormed the Dutch battery and spiked its guns. None of the attacking force was killed or wounded in the operation.

After the Anglo-Russian invasion of Holland in August 1799 Humphreys left Juno and moved to the 50-gun , which was then the flagship of Vice-Admiral Sir Andrew Mitchell with the Channel Fleet. Humphreys moved again with Mitchell to the 90-gun  in 1800, and while serving aboard her, received a promotion to commander, on 29 April 1802.

Command
Despite his promotion, Humphreys had to wait nearly two years before receiving his own command, until finally appointed to the bomb vessel  at Portsmouth in January 1804. His time in command was short, as on 8 May he was promoted to post captain. He married Jane Elizabeth Morin in March 1805, the couple having one son together. Humphreys went out to Halifax the following year to take command of the 50-gun , the flagship of the station commander Vice-Admiral George Berkeley. He assumed command on his arrival in May, but it was then decided to send Leander back to Britain, and Humphreys was instead transferred to the 50-gun  in October. Berkeley preferred to live onshore, meaning that for much of the time Leopard acted as a private ship.

The Chesapeake–Leopard affair

The Royal Navy had been having significant problems with men deserting their ships whilst in American ports, and then joining ships of the US Navy. Berkeley had been made aware of deserters from several ships who had joined the crew of the heavy frigate , and on 1 June 1807 he issued an order that Chesapeake be stopped at sea and searched for deserters. Apprehending them in town proved impossible as the men were under the protection of the magistrates. Berkeley directed that in return, the American captain was permitted to search British vessels for American deserters. Sent to enforce Berkeley's order, Captain Humphreys located Chesapeake off Norfolk, Virginia on 22 June and sent a lieutenant across to request permission to search her. Chesapeakes commander, Commodore James Barron, refused to allow this and ordered his men to prepare for an action. Faced with Barron's refusal, Humphreys bore up and opened fire on her, hitting her with several broadsides. The unprepared Chesapeake fired a single shot in reply, and then struck her colours. They were taken aboard Leopard, which then departed, Humphreys having refused to accept Barron's offer to consider Chesapeake a prize. Chesapeake had three men killed, eight men badly wounded, and ten slightly wounded.

Though his conduct was approved of by Berkeley, it caused outrage amongst the Americans and became a major political incident. Anxious to appease the Americans, an Order in Council was issued, banning the use of force against foreign warships, Berkeley was recalled and Humphreys too found himself a victim of political movements. He returned to Britain in 1808 and was not offered any further commands. He was given the title of rear admiral in 1837.

Life ashore

Humphreys spent the remainder of the war ashore on half-pay, finding occupation in civil duties, serving as a Justice of the Peace for Buckingham, Chester and Lancaster. His wife Jane died in September 1808, and Humphreys remarried on 31 May 1810, to Maria Davenport, of Bramall Hall. The couple had five sons and two daughters together.

After the wars had ended he was put on the list of superannuated captains, but achieved some recompense when he was made a Companion of the Bath on 26 September 1831, on the occasion of King William IV's Coronation Honours. He received a further honour when he was nominated a Knight Commander of the Guelphic Order of Hanover in February 1834, and was promoted to rear admiral on 10 January 1837. He assumed the surname of Davenport when his wife inherited the Davenport estates at Bramall in 1838, and was restored to the active list on 17 August 1840. He settled at Bramall and had become widely respected in the Stockport area prior to his wife's inheritance, but following his succession to the estate there were disputes from other members of the Davenport family who claimed a right to the property. He moved with Maria to Cheltenham in 1841, most likely because living at Bramall had become expensive or because of health concerns. He died there on 17 November 1845 at the age of sixty-six and was buried in Leckhampton.

See also

Notes

a.   was a former British ship, which had run aground off Vlieland on 26 August 1797 and was captured by the Dutch.

b.

c.  Ratford, the only British citizen of the four, was executed. The remaining three were American citizens and were sentenced to 500 lashes each, though this was later commuted.

Citations

References

1778 births
1845 deaths
Royal Navy rear admirals
Royal Navy personnel of the French Revolutionary Wars
Royal Navy personnel of the Napoleonic Wars
Royal Navy personnel of the War of 1812
Companions of the Order of the Bath
Military personnel from Shropshire
Burials in Gloucestershire